The men's 440 yards event at the 1934 British Empire Games was held on 5, 6 and 7 August at the White City Stadium in London, England.

Medalists

Results

Heats
Qualification: First 2 in each heat (Q) qualify directly for the semifinals.

Semifinals
Qualification: First 3 in each heat (Q) qualify directly for the final.

Final

References

Athletics at the 1934 British Empire Games
1934